"Trademark" is a song written by Porter Wagoner and Gary Walker, performed by Carl Smith, and released by Columbia Records (catalog No. 21119). In July 1953, it entered Billboard magazine's country charts, peaked at No. 2 on the best seller chart (No. 5 juke box), and remained on the chart for 16 weeks.

References

Carl Smith (musician) songs
1953 songs